James Mellor Paulton (1857 – 6 December 1923) was a British journalist and Liberal politician who sat in the House of Commons from 1885 to 1910.

Paulton was the son of Abraham Walter Paulton of Bolton, and his wife Martha Mellor, daughter of James Mellor, of Liverpool. Venn says that his father was the first editor of the Manchester Examiner. Paulton was educated at London International College and at Trinity Hall, Cambridge. He was admitted at Inner Temple on 9 November 1878, but became a journalist.  He was war correspondent for the Manchester Examiner in 1884 when he reported on the campaign in Egypt. He was present at Battle of El Teb in 1884.

At the 1885 general election, Paulton was elected as Member of Parliament for Bishop Auckland. 
He was private Secretary to James Bryce and Hugh Childers in the Home Office in 1886, and assistant private secretary to H. H. Asquith from 1893 to 1895. He held his seat until he retired from the House of Commons at the January 1910 election.

Paulton was assistant paymaster-general at the Supreme Court from 1909 to 1921

References

External links 
 

1857 births
1923 deaths
Liberal Party (UK) MPs for English constituencies
UK MPs 1885–1886
UK MPs 1886–1892
UK MPs 1892–1895
UK MPs 1895–1900
UK MPs 1900–1906
UK MPs 1906–1910
English male journalists
Members of the Inner Temple
Alumni of Trinity Hall, Cambridge
English male non-fiction writers